WSV can mean:

The ISO 639 code for Wotapuri-Katarqalai language
Winter service vehicle, a snow-clearing vehicle
Washington Square Village, an apartment complex in New York City
Windows Server Virtualization, virtual machine software from Microsoft
Any of a number of German football clubs:
SV Wehen
SV Wilhelmshaven
Wuppertaler SV Borussia